Kunzea sulphurea is a flowering plant in the myrtle family, Myrtaceae and is endemic to Western Australia.

It blooms between September and November producing yellow flowers.

Often found on dunes, ridge tops and seasonally wet flats in the South West and Great Southern regions of Western Australia where it grows in sandy soil types.

References

sulphurea
Endemic flora of Western Australia
Myrtales of Australia
Rosids of Western Australia
Plants described in 1923